Adrián Ignacio Cuadra Cabrera (born 23 October 1997) is a professional Chilean football midfielder currently playing for C.D. Antofagasta in the Primera División of Chile.

International career
He was called up for the senior national team to face Mexico in June 2016, but failed to make an appearance.

References

 
 Adrián Cuadra profile on the official Santiago Wanderers website

Chilean footballers
Santiago Wanderers footballers
Association football midfielders
Sportspeople from Valparaíso
1997 births
Living people